Mussel Shoals is a coastal unincorporated community in Ventura County, California, between Ventura and the Santa Barbara County city of Carpinteria.

The community lies along U.S. Route 101 southeast of La Conchita and northwest of Faria. A one-lane causeway links the community with artificial Rincon Island.

Until  the 1930s, the area from Bates Road down to Mussel Shoals (then known as Mussel Rock) was referred to as La Conchita.

References

Populated coastal places in California
Geography of Ventura County, California
Unincorporated communities in Ventura County, California
Unincorporated communities in California
Beaches of Ventura County, California